The Cork Premier Senior Hurling Championship (known for sponsorship reasons as the Co-Op Superstores Cork Premier Senior Hurling Championship and abbreviated to the Cork PSHC) is an annual club hurling competition organised by the Cork County Board of the Gaelic Athletic Association and contested by the top-ranking senior clubs and amalgamated teams in the county of Cork in Ireland, deciding the competition winners through a group and knockout format. It is the most prestigious competition in Cork hurling.

Introduced in 1887 as the Cork Senior Hurling Championship, it was initially a straight knockout tournament open only to senior-ranking club teams, with its winner reckoned as the Cork county champion. The competition took on its current name in 2020, adding a round-robin group stage and limiting the number of club and divisional entrants.

In its present format, the Cork Premier Senior Championship begins with a preliminary qualifying round for the divisional teams and educational institutions. The sole surviving team from this stage automatically qualified for the knockout phase. The 12 club teams are drawn into three groups of four teams and play each other in a single round-robin system. The three group winners, three runners-up and three third-placed teams proceed to the knockout phase that culminates with the final match at Páirc Uí Chaoimh in October. The winner of the Cork Premier Senior Championship, as well as being presented with the Seán Óg Murphy Cup, qualifies for the subsequent Munster Club Championship. In 2020, the intended format was disrupted and slightly amended due to the impact of the COVID-19 pandemic.

The competition has been won by 19 teams, 14 of which have won it more than once. Blackrock is the most successful team in the tournament's history, having won it 33 times. Midleton are the reigning champions, having beaten Glen Rovers by 0-24 to 1-18 in the 2021 final.

History

19th century
Following the foundation of the Gaelic Athletic Association in 1884, new rules for Gaelic football and hurling were drawn up and published in the United Irishman newspaper. Throughout 1886, county committees were established, with the Cork County Board affiliating on 19 December 1886. Plans to hold championships in both hurling and football were drawn up over the following weeks, with an advert inviting teams to enter appearing in the Cork Examiner on 15 January 1887. The cost of entering a team was 2s 6d and the closing date for entries was 29 January 1887. The championship draw took place at 23 Maylor Street on the day after the closing date and "the utmost good feeling was displayed, and...the contesting parties were agreeably satisfied" as the draw took place. 22 teams from 20 clubs entered. Agahda and Cork National Hurling Club each entered two teams, while Aghabullogue, Ballinhassig, Ballygarvan, Blarney, Carrignavar, Charleville, Douglas, Evergreen Road, Glasheen, Inniscarra, Little Island, Mogeely, Monkstown, Passage, Quarry Road, St. Finabarr's, St Mary's and Tower Street each entered one team.

All of the matches in the inaugural championship took place at a special enclosure in Cork City Park, with the very first match taking place "in the presence of several thousand persons" at 2;30 pm on 6 March 1887. Mr. J. E. Kennedy acted as referee and Messrs E. Cotter and W. Sheehan performed the duties of goal umpires. Glasheen beat Cork National Hurling Club's 2nd 21 by 1-02 to no score. The championship progressed as matches continued throughout the summer, however, the final stages ended in disarray. The semi-final between Cork Nationals Hurling Club 1st 21 and St. Finbarr's ended after twenty minutes when both sides and the match officials disagreed over the awarding of a point. An emergency meeting of the Cork County Committee was held with representatives from Passage Hurling Club, St. Finbarr's and the Cork Nationals being brought before the meeting. After some discussion, the Passage Hurling Club agreed to withdraw from the championship. St. Finbarr's agreed to a proposal that lots be drawn between themselves and the Cork Nationals to decide who would represent Cork in the 1887 All-Ireland Championship. The Cork Nationals rejected the idea, however, they were later awarded the championship.

The 1888 championship saw an increase in the number of participating teams to 35. In an effort to cut down on travel costs for clubs, the County Board adopted a divisional structure to the championship. The participating teams were divided into six divisions along geographic lines; Cork City, East Cork, Mid Cork, North Cork, North-East Cork and South Cork. There were no hurling clubs in West Cork. The six divisional champions qualified for the county-wide series of games. The first final to be played took place on 29 April 1888, with Tower Street beating Ballygarvan by 4-01 to 0-01. Tower Street later went on to win the very first Munster Championship as the Cork representatives.

Towards the end of 1888, a serious split in the Association in Cork lead to the existence of three rival and distinct county boards. 40 clubs left the official board and affiliated to the Cork Board, under the presidency of Fr. O'Connor, and the O'Brien Board under the presidency of Fr. Carver. These three boards ran their own separate championships over the following two seasons, however, the Cork County Board remained as the official administrative branch of the GAA. In 1890, Aghabullogue, as official county champions, became the first Cork representatives to win the All-Ireland Championship. The three individual boards unified under the banner of the Cork County Board in 1891, with the championship continuing to be run on a divisional basis. There was such intense interest in the championship that year amongst the general public that it was reported in The Nation newspaper that the attendance of 16,000 at the Blackrock-St. Finbarr's game set a new attendance record for a hurling game in the whole of Ireland. The championship reverted to a straight knock-out format in 1892. 14 teams from 10 clubs entered, with the first and second teams being separated in the draw.

20th century

A delay in the 1904 championship meant that the 1905 championship never took place. In spite of this, St. Finbarr's were subsequently awarded the title after beating Ballymartle in the 1906 final. On 26 January 1908, the newly-built Cork Athletic Grounds hosted the final for the very first time. It remained as the regular final venue for the following 67 years. The War of Independence (1919-1921) saw Cork take a prominent role, something which had an adverse effect on the smooth running of the championships. Civil unrest following a series of events, including the murder of Lord Mayor Tomás Mac Curtain, the death from hunger strike of Lord Mayor Terence MacSwiney and the burning of Cork at the height of the war, resulted in the 1920 championship being delayed by two years and the entire cancellation of the 1921 championship.

The first decades of the new century brought new teams but not in a traditional sense. Food production company Crosse & Blackwell, third level educational institution University College Cork (UCC) and Collins Military Barracks all entered teams, however, UCC are the only team to continue fielding a team as of 2020. The creation of the divisional boards in the late 1920s added a new dimension to the championship. These divisional teams were composed of junior and intermediate players and afforded every player in the county the chance of winning a senior championship medal. Avondhu, Carbery and Muskerry became the first divisions to enter teams when they did so in the 1933 championship.

On 20 August 1976, Glen Rovers defeated Seandún by 4-10 to 1-06 in the first senior championship game to take place at the newly-built Páirc Uí Chaoimh. The 1976 final later became the first final to be played at the new stadium. The Mardyke hosted the two previous finals due to the demolition of the old Athletic Grounds.

After 90 years of using the single-elimination straight knock-out format, problems arose regarding the standard of the competing teams. A special committee was established to examine the possibility of restructuring the championship format. At the County Convention on 5 February 1978, delegates voted by 143 to 93 in favour of abandoning the knock-out format and adopting a group stage. This format was used for three successive season from 1978 until 1980, with Blackrock and St. Finbarr's becoming the first teams to win the championship after suffering a defeat. The County Board voted to revert to the single-elimination straight knock-out format in 1981.

In 1995, Cork Regional Technical College were permitted to field a team in the championship for the first time.

21st century

The introduction of a "back door" system at inter-county level in the All-Ireland Championship in 1997 led to the idea of introducing a second chance for defeated teams at county level. In 2000 a double-elimination format was introduced which afforded all club teams a second chance by remaining in the championship after a first-round defeat. In the two decades that followed the championship format continued to evolve with a number of minor tweaks. The provision of a second chance for defeated teams was later expanded to allow teams the opportunity of being defeated twice and still remain in the championship. The splitting of the intermediate grade in two resulted in the introduction of relegation in 2006, with Delanys becoming the first team to be relegated that year. Prior to this teams were allowed to decide for themselves if they wanted to regrade or retain their senior status. In 2015 the championship once again reverted to a double-elimination format.

Redevelopment of Páirc Uí Chaoimh saw the final played outside of its regular venue for the first time in nearly 40 years, with the 2015 and 2016 finals being played at Páirc Uí Rinn.

Domination, shock victories and rivalries

Team dominance
Since the beginning the championship has been dominated by Blackrock, St. Finbarr's and Glen Rovers who are collectively known as the "big three". They have won a combined total of 84 championship titles. Blackrock dominated the first thirty years of the championship, winning 15 titles between 1887 and 1920. It was during this time that the county championship earned the nickname of the "little All-Ireland" due to its competitive nature. St. Finbarr's, after making a breakthrough in the early years of the 20th century, were the team of the decade for the 1920s before regularly claiming championship titles in each of the decades that followed. Glen Rovers made their own breakthrough with a first championship in 1934 and were the dominant club from then until the 1960s. Between 1971 and 1982, the "big three" shared every available championship title. Their rivalry reached its peak in the 1977 final when a record attendance of 34,151 saw St. Finbarr's defeat Glen Rovers.

Since that zenith the "big three" have only claimed two titles in each of the decades from 1990 to 2019 as the power base of Cork hurling has moved from the city to the county with several clubs making significant breakthroughs and impacts on the championship. In 1983 Midleton broke the decade-long hegemony and went on to claim five championships over a thirty-year period to 2013. In 1990 Na Piarsaigh became the first city club outside of the "big three" since Redmonds in 1917 to claim the championship. They added two more titles in 1995 and 2004. Erin's Own also added their name to the roll of honour in 1992 before winning further titles in 2006 and 2007. The mid nineties saw the rise of the divisional sides, with Carbery, Avondhu and Imokilly claiming four championship titles between 1994 and 1998. The success of Newtownshandrum between 2000 and 2009 also highlighted the changing demographics of Cork hurling as the tiny parish of 800 people won four championships during that decade. Sarsfields, although close in proximity to the city but based in the East Cork division, ended a 51-year famine in 2008 by claiming their third championship title ever. Between 2008 and 2015 they appeared in seven finals and won four titles. The East Cork village of Carrigtwohill ended a 93-wait for their second championship title in 2011.

In recent decades many rural and city-based clubs have also contested championship deciders without making a successful breakthrough. These include Ballyhea, Cloyne, Bride Rovers and Bishopstown. Educational institutions like University College Cork and Cork Institute of Technology have also appeared in finals.

Historic results

The possibility of unlikely victories at any stage of the championship, where a so-called "minnow" beat a traditionally higher placed opposition, is much anticipated by the public. Such upsets and shock results are considered an integral part of the tradition and prestige of the championship and, in some cases, can lead to the championship race being blown wide open. Historically speaking, the biggest shock of the first 50 years of the championship took place when Mallow beat 18-time and reigning champions Blackrock in the 1928 second round. The great run of success by Glen Rovers, who secured eight championship titles in succession between 1934 and 1941, was ended in the semi-final by Ballincollig, a team who had never won the championship and had been beaten by the Glen in the previous year's final. In the 1994 final, Carbery, a division where Gaelic football dominated, beat Midleton to take the title. The latter stages of the 2011 championship featured a number of shock results, including the Cork Institute of Technology beating Newtownshandrum by 14 points and Carrigtwohill beating Midleton before going on to win their first title in 93 years. University College Cork's 1-23 to 1-20 defeat of four-in-a-row hopefuls Imokilly in the 2020 championship was the most recent shock result.

Rivalries
Matches between keen rivals in the championship are often heated and tension-filled affairs. However, the matches and the rivalries they encompass are frequently listed among the best in the championship. Rivalries can stem from a number of reasons, including the geographic proximity of the teams involved and the glory of "beating the neighbours" to an urban-rural rivalry between teams. In Cork city the River Lee often leads to a northside-southside rivalry.

Some of the more prominent rivalries include:
Ballyhea–Newtownshandrum 
Blackrock–Glen Rovers
Blackrock–St Finbarr's
Glen Rovers–Na Piarsaigh
Glen Rovers–St Finbarr's

Format

History
In the 131 championships prior to 2020, many different championship formats were used. These include straight knockout, divisional formats, group stages, double-elimination and triple-elimination.

Current

Development
On 2 April 2019, a majority of 136 club delegates voted to restructure the championship. The new format led to the splitting of the championship in two and the creation of the Cork Premier Senior Championship and the Cork Senior A Championship.

Overview
Group stage: The 12 club teams are divided into three groups of four. Over the course of the group stage, which features one game in April and two games in August, each team plays once against the others in the group, resulting in each team being guaranteed at least three games. Two points are awarded for a win, one for a draw and zero for a loss. The teams are ranked in the group stage table by points gained, then scoring difference and then their head-to-head record. The top two teams in each group qualify for the quarter-finals.

Divisional and colleges section: University College Cork, Cork Institute of Technology and the divisional sides compete in a separate section, with one team qualifying for the knock-out stage.

Preliminary quarter-finals: Two lone preliminary quarter-finals feature the three third-placed teams from the group stage and the winners of the divisional and colleges section. Two teams qualify for the next round.

Quarter-finals: The four quarter-finals feature the six teams from the group stage and the two preliminary quarter-final winners. Four teams qualify for the next round.

Semi-finals: The two semi-finals feature four teams. Two teams qualify for the next round.

Final: The two semi-final winners contest the final. The winning team are declared champions.

Teams

2023 teams

Clubs eligible for divisional teams

Sponsorship
TSB Bank became the first title sponsor of the championship, serving in that capacity until 2005 when the Evening Echo signed a sponsorship deal. In 2020, Dairygold Co-Op Superstores were unveiled as the new title sponsor of the Cork Premier Senior Championship.

Qualification for subsequent competitions
The Cork Premier Senior Hurling Championship winners qualify for the subsequent Munster Senior Club Hurling Championship. This place is reserved for club teams only as divisional and amalgamated teams are not allowed in the provincial championship. If a divisional side wins the Cork Championship then the runners-up qualify for the Munster Championship. This has occurred on six occasions. If two divisional sides qualify for the final then the provincial championship place is given to one of the defeated semi-finalists. This occurred in 1996 when Na Piarsaigh represented Cork due to Avondhu and Imokilly contesting the final.

Venues

Group stage

Fixtures in the group stage of the championship are usually played at a neutral venue that is deemed halfway between the participating teams. Some of the more common venues include Mallow GAA Complex, Brinny Sportsfield, Coachford Pitch and Clonmult Memorial Park. All games in the knockout stage are played at either Páirc Uí Rinn or Páirc Uí Chaoimh.

Final
The final has been played at the rebuilt Páirc Uí Chaoimh since it opened in 2017. The rebuilding process meant that the finals of 2015 and 2016 were hosted at Páirc Uí Rinn. Continuing work on the pitch at the new stadium resulted in the 2019 final also being played at Páirc Uí Rinn. Prior to rebuilding, the final was hosted by the original Páirc Uí Chaoimh since it opened in 1976. The final was played at the Mardyke in 1974 and 1975, while in the 70 years prior to the development of Páirc Uí Chaoimh the final was usually played at the Cork Athletic Grounds. From the inaugural championship in 1887 up to the turn of the 20th century, the final was held at a variety of venues in the city and around the county, most notably the Cork Park enclosure. The other venues used during this period include:
Blarney Sportsfield (1890)
Mallow Town Park (1891, 1895-1986, 1914)
Carrigtwohill Sportsfield (1900)
Turners Cross (1901-1903)
Ballinhassig Sportsfield (1906)
Carrignafoy Ground (1908)
Riverstown Sportsfield (1911)

Managers
Managers in the Cork Championship are involved in the day-to-day running of the team, including the training, team selection, and sourcing of players. Their influence varies from club-to-club and is related to the individual club committees. The manager is assisted by a team of two or three selectors and a backroom team consisting of various coaches.

Trophy and medals
The Seán Óg Murphy Cup is the current prize for winning the championship. It was commissioned to honour Seán Óg Murphy who served as a hurler, selector and County Board Secretary at various times over a 45-year period. Prior to this, several different cups and trophies had been presented to winning captains. The Seán Óg Murphy Cup is similar in design to the Liam MacCarthy Cup which was constructed to look like a medieval Irish drinking vessel called a mather. The cup bears the Irish inscription: Croabh Iomána Sinsear, Coiste Chontae Chorcaí de Cumann Lúthchleas Gael, a bhronn an corn seo, 1963, mar cuimhne ar Seán Óg Ó Murchú. Des Kiely of University College Cork was the first recipient of the cup when it was presented to him by the widow of the late Seán Óg Murphy after the 1963 final.

Traditionally, at Páirc Uí Chaoimh, the victory presentation takes place at a special rostrum in the main grandstand. At Páirc Uí Rinn the presentation was made on a podium on the pitch. The cup is decorated with ribbons in the colours of the winning team. During the game the cup actually has both teams' sets of ribbons attached and the runners-up ribbons are removed before the presentation. The winning captain accepts the cup on behalf of his team before giving a short speech. Individual members of the winning team then have an opportunity to come to the rostrum to lift the cup, which is held by the winning team until the following year's final. 

In accordance with GAA rules, the County Board awards a set of gold medals to the championship winners. The medals depict a stylised version of the Cork GAA crest.

Roll of honour

By Division

List of finals

Notes:
 1933 - The first match ended in a draw: St. Finbarr's	4-6, Carrigtwohill 5-3.
 1943 - The first match ended in a draw: St. Finbarr's	3-3, Ballincollig 3-3.
 1952 - The first match ended in a draw: Avondhu 3-9, St. Finbarr's 4-6.
 1955 - The first match ended in a draw: St. Finbarr's	2-6, Glen Rovers 1-9.
 1962 - The first match ended in a draw: Glen Rovers 3-7, University College Cork 2-10
 1990 - The first match ended in a draw: Na Piarsaigh 1-12, St. Finbarr's 3-6.
 1996 - The first match ended in a draw: Avondhu 1-12, Imokilly 1-12.
 2020 - The match ended in a draw before extra time was played.

Records and statistics

Final

Team
Most wins: 33: 
Blackrock (1887, 1889, 1891, 1893, 1894, 1895, 1897, 1898, 1903, 1908, 1910, 1911, 1912, 1913, 1920, 1924, 1925, 1927, 1929, 1930, 1931, 1956, 1961, 1971, 1973, 1975, 1978, 1979, 1985, 1999, 2001, 2002, 2020)
Most consecutive wins: 8:
Glen Rovers (1934, 1935, 1936, 1937, 1938, 1939, 1940, 1941)
Most appearances in a final: 53:
Blackrock (1887, 1889, 1891, 1892, 1893, 1894, 1895, 1897, 1898, 1903, 1908, 1910, 1911, 1912, 1913, 1914, 1918, 1919, 1920, 1922, 1923, 1924, 1925, 1926, 1927, 1929, 1930, 1931, 1939, 1948, 1954, 1956, 1959, 1961, 1963, 1971, 1973, 1974, 1975, 1976, 1978, 1979, 1982, 1985, 1986, 1998, 1999, 2001, 2002, 2003, 2017, 2020, 2022)
Most appearances in a final without ever winning: 3, joint record
 Aghada (1889, 1890, 1897)
 Ballincollig (1941, 1942, 1943)
 Cloyne (2004, 2005, 2006)
Most appearances in a final without losing (streak): 11
 Blackrock (1893, 1894, 1895, 1897, 1898, 1903, 1908, 1910, 1911, 1912, 1913)
Biggest win: 40 points
 Blackrock 14-04 - 2-00 Fairhill, (1920)
Most goals in a final: 17
 Glen Rovers 10-06 - 7-05 Sarsfields, (1940)
Most goals by a losing side: 7
 Sarsfields 7-05 - 10-06 Glen Rovers, (1940)
Most defeats: 20
 Blackrock (1892, 1914, 1918, 1919, 1922, 1923, 1926, 1939, 1948, 1954, 1959, 1963, 1974, 1976, 1982, 1986, 1998, 2003, 2017, 2022)

Individual
Most wins by a player: 14, Christy Ring (Glen Rovers) (1941, 1944, 1945, 1948, 1949, 1950, 1953, 1954, 1958, 1959, 1960, 1962, 1964, 1967)

Teams

By decade
The most successful team of each decade, judged by number of Cork Senior Hurling Championship titles, is as follows:
 1880s: 2 for Blackrock (1887–89)
 1890s: 6 for Blackrock (1891-93-94-95-97-98)
 1900s: 3 for St. Finbarr's (1904-05-06)
 1910s: 4 for Blackrock (1910-11-12-13)
 1920s: 5 for St. Finbarr's (1920-24-25-27-29)
 1930s: 6 for Glen Rovers (1934-35-36-37-38-39)
 1940s: 6 for Glen Rovers (1940-41-44-45-48-49)
 1950s: 5 for Glen Rovers (1950-53-54-57-58)
 1960s: 5 for Glen Rovers (1960-62-64-67-69)
 1970s: 5 for Blackrock (1971-73-75-78-79)
 1980s: 5 for St. Finbarr's (1980-81-82-84-88)
 1990s: 2 each for Na Piarsaigh (1990–95) and Imokilly (1997–98)
 2000s: 4 for Newtownshandrum (2000-03-05-09)
 2010s: 3 each for Sarsfields (2010-12-14) and Imokilly (2017-18-19)

Successful defending
Only 7 teams of the 19 who have won the championship have ever successfully defended the title. These are:
 Glen Rovers on 14 attempts out of 26 (1935, 1936, 1937, 1938, 1939, 1940, 1941, 1945, 1949, 1950, 1954, 1959, 1960, 2016)
 Blackrock on 11 attempts out of 31 (1894, 1895, 1898, 1911, 1912, 1913, 1925, 1930, 1931, 1979, 2002)
 St. Finbarr's on 8 attempts out of 24 (1905, 1906, 1923, 1933, 1943, 1947, 1981, 1982)
 Imokilly on 3 attempts out of 4 (1997, 2018, 2019)
 Redmonds on 1 attempt out of 4 (1901)
 Midleton on 1 attempt out of 6 (1987)
 Erin's Own on 1 attempt out of 2 (2007)

Gaps
Longest gaps between successive championship titles:
 93 years: Carrigtwohill (1918-2011)
 67 years: Midleton (1916-1983)
 51 years: Sarsfields (1957-2008)
 30 years: Avondhu (1966-1996)
 29 years: St. Finbarr's (1993-2022)
 26 years: Glen Rovers (1989-2015)
 25 years: Blackrock (1931-1956)
 22 years: Midleton (1991-2013)
 19 years: Imokilly (1998-2017)
 18 years: Blackrock (2002-2020)

Longest undefeated run
The record for the longest unbeaten run stands at 30 games held by Glen Rovers. It began with a 5-06 to 3-00 win against Mallow in their opening game of the 1934 championship on 22 April 1934 and finished with a 3-08 to 3-01 win against Sarsfields in the first round of the 1942 championship on 17 May 1942. The 30-game unbeaten streak, which included no drawn game but one walkover, ended with a 5-04 to 1-08 loss to Ballincollig in the 1942 championship semi-final.

Top scorers

All time

By year (1970–present)

In a single game (2011–present)

In finals (1934–present)

Cumulative finals

Man of the match
List of county final man of the match award winners:

Winners and finalists

The Double
Three teams have won the Cork Senior Hurling Championship and the Cork Senior Football Championship in a single year as part of a hurling-Gaelic football double. Glen Rovers and their sister club, St. Nicholas', became the first teams to win the double in 1938 before claiming two further doubles in 1941 and 1954. University College Cork won their only double in 1963. St. Finbarr's hold the distinction of being the only single entity club team to have won the double. They achieved this in 1980 and 1982.

Divisional sides Avondhu, Carbery and Imokilly and club team Midleton also hold the distinction of being dual county senior championship-winning teams, however, these were not achieved in a single calendar season.

Media coverage

Radio
C103 & CRY 104.0FM provides extensive radio coverage of the championship, including several full live commentaries from Round 1 to the final. Both will cover the final live. 

The Big Red Bench on Cork's Red FM cover most games with reports and updates on radio and their Twitter feed.

Television
TG4 has carried live and deferred television broadcasts of several finals over the years as part of its GAA Beo programme. On 29 April 2018, TG4 broadcast live coverage of a Round 1 double-header for the first time. The awarding of TV rights to RTÉ saw the broadcaster carry live coverage of games in 2019.

See also
 List of Cork Senior Hurling Championship winners

References

 
1887 establishments in Ireland
1
Recurring sporting events established in 1887
Senior hurling county championships